Fried bread is a slice of bread that has been fried. 
It is used as a substitute for toast in various dishes or meals. Various oils, butter, lard, bacon drippings, or ghee can be used. Some cooks may choose to fry rather than toast to avoid having to give counter or storage space to or spend money on a toaster. Proponents of frying rather than toasting call out the extra flavor and crispiness that can be achieved by frying in fat rather than dry-toasting.

French toast is a type of fried bread that is soaked in a batter before frying.

Nutrition 
A small slice (35g) of fried bread has 174 calories.

Around the world 
Multiple cuisines include a dish that involves frying sliced bread.

Brazil 
Rabanada is a dish imported from Portugal and popular in Brazil as a Christmas dish.

Czech Republic 
 or topinka is a Czech dish of pan-fried bread used to prevent wasting stale bread.

Great Britain & Ireland 
A full English breakfast will often include bread fried in oil, butter, lard, or bacon drippings. In Northern Ireland, an Ulster fry may include fried soda farls.

Italy 
Pane fritto is an Italian fried bread dish often used to prevent wasting stale bread; it is commonly dipped in milk before frying.

United States 
In the United States, toast is much more popular at breakfast. However, fried bread is still eaten, particularly in the form of French toast, but sometimes as simply a slice of bread fried in butter.

See also

 Fried dough
 List of breads

References

British breads
Cuisine of Northern Ireland
Irish breads
Fried foods